Paul J. Fribourg (born 1954/55) is an American businessman, the chairman and CEO of ContiGroup Companies since 1976, a global agribusiness and food company, since 1976. Continental Grain was founded by Simon Fribourg in Arlon, Belgium in 1813. He is the sixth generation of the Fribourg family to lead the company.

Early life
Paul J. Fribourg is the son of Jewish-American businessman Michel Fribourg, chairman emeritus of Continental Grain, who died on April 10, 2001, and his wife Mary Ann. He has four siblings, brothers Robert and Charles, and sisters Nadine and Caroline.

He has a bachelor's degree in business administration and economics from Amherst College.

Career
Fribourg has been the chairman and CEO of ContiGroup Companies since 1976.

He is a director of Estée Lauder, Restaurant Brands International, Syngenta, Bunge, Restaurant Technologies and Loews Corporation.

Personal life
He married Josabeth Amar, the daughter of a Moroccan Jewish businessman, David Amar, and they have four children together, and three children from her first marriage.

In 2012, Fribourg spent $27.2 million on a 5-bedroom, 5-bathroom apartment on New York's Fifth Avenue, previously owned by Bruce Fiedorek, the former vice chair of Morgan Stanley.

References

1950s births
Living people
American businesspeople
American people of Belgian-Jewish descent